The Xinnong–Jinshanwei Expressway, commonly referred to as the Xinwei Expressway and designated S19, is a  in Shanghai, China. It runs entirely within Jinshan District, between the towns of Xinnong to the north and Jinshanwei to the south, which give the expressway its name. It was formerly designated as A6.

Route 
The Xinnong–Jinshanwei Expressway is a north-south expressway located entirely in Jinshan District. It begins at the Xinnong Interchange, an interchange with G1501 Shanghai Ring Expressway to the north and east and S36 Tinglin–Fengjing Expressway to the west. It proceeds south to an interchange with G15 Shenyang–Haikou Expressway near Jinshanwei. A short segment of the expressway continues beyond the interchange to a toll booth, where the expressway terminates and becomes Xinwei Highway.

Exit list

References 

Expressways in Shanghai